Nikolai Dmitriyevich Sergeyev (September 22, 1909 – February 11, 1999) was a Fleet Admiral and Chief of staff of the Soviet Navy.

Biography
Sergeyev joined the Navy in 1928 and completed the M.V. Frunze Higher Naval School in 1931. In 1932 he joined the Amur Military Flotilla in the Far East and served on and commanded river monitors. He completed the Naval Academy in 1941.

During World War II Sergeyev first served on the Main Navy Staff planning amphibious operations and then commanded monitors with the Volga Flotilla before returning to the Main Navy Staff in 1943.

After the war Sergeyev continued to serve on the Main Navy Staff and took part in the Soviet nuclear testing programme near Novaya Zemlya. He became head of the Main Operations Directorate in 1953 and Chief of Naval Staff in 1964, serving for 13 years (longer than anyone else) in that post. He was promoted to Fleet Admiral in 1970 and was Inspector General in the Ministry of Defence. 

Sergeyev retired in 1992 and died in Moscow in 1999. He is buried in the Novodevichy Cemetery.

Honours and awards
Two Orders of Lenin
Order of the October Revolution
Order of the Red Banner, three times
Order of Nakhimov, 2nd class
Order of the Patriotic War, 1st class, twice
Order of the Red Banner of Labour
Order of the Red Star, three times
Order of Zhukov (Russian Federation, 1995)
USSR State Prize
Jubilee Medal "In Commemoration of the 100th Anniversary of the Birth of Vladimir Ilyich Lenin"

References
In Russian language:
Советская военная энциклопедия в 8-ми томах. М,:Военное издательство, 1976-1981. - Том 7. - С.329-330.
В.Д. Доценко. Морской биографический словарь. СПб,:«LOGOS», 1995. - С.371.

1909 births
1999 deaths
People from Kiev Governorate
Soviet admirals
Soviet military personnel of World War II
Recipients of the Order of Zhukov
Recipients of the Order of Lenin
Recipients of the Order of the Red Banner
Recipients of the Order of Nakhimov, 2nd class
Recipients of the USSR State Prize
Burials at Novodevichy Cemetery
N. G. Kuznetsov Naval Academy alumni